A placement exam or placement test is a test designed to evaluate a person's preexisting knowledge of a subject and thus determine the level most suitable for the person to begin coursework on that subject.

In many countries, including the United States, it is not unusual for students to take a placement exam in a subject such as mathematics upon entering middle or high school to determine what level of classes they should take. Typically, students are then placed on a tracking system determined by the class they are approved to enter—for example, if a student takes music theory to students whose knowledge in that area is more advanced than what a typical entering freshman's would be in those subjects. Scores on such exams as the Advanced Placement, International Baccalaureate, SAT Subject Tests, and British Advanced Level exams can also serve as placement tests for students in certain subjects, where a high score would enable them to get into a more advanced class than what a freshman would normally take.

References 

School examinations